Kris Vanderheyden (Halle, Belgium),  known by his stage name as Insider, is a Belgian techno and electronic  music producer. He is considered one of the leading pioneers of the Belgian originated techno electronic dance music scene.

He was born of a French mother and a Belgian father, a trumpet player who was a Latin music lover and owner of an enormous record collection with artists spanning from James Brown to Donna Summer and genres from Classical and Jazz to Zydeco.

While growing up, Vanderheyden spent most of his childhood with his grandmother and an uncle who was a fan of Led Zeppelin, Pink Floyd and The Sex Pistols. This mixture of musical genres came to influence his music career later in life.

At the age of 16, Vanderheyden took a position at a local record store in Halle Belgium called Eddy's Records where he became even more consumed with music. After saving enough money from his job, he bought his first synthesizer, a Roland W30 and started to compose his very own music in his bedroom.

Music Man Records:

After recording some early demos, Music Man Records offered Vanderheyden a recording contract. The initial release went well but it was his next release under his INSIDER moniker which became his first real breakthrough.

According to Vanderheyden, "I went to the owner of Music Man (Hessel Tieter) and said, 'If you give me a sizable advance to purchase more recording equipment, I will give you a hit record'. Hessel contacted Frank de Wulf to ask him for advice and he replied, 'Do It'. One week later, my song 'Destiny' was born".
 
Because "Destiny" was such a big hit and so ahead of its time, Vanderheyden was able to tour the world. He performed at the most prestigious events like Mayday and Dorian Grey across Europe. Vanderheyden also became the first Belgian artist to headline at New York City's famed The Limelight Club for controversial party promoter Lord Michael's Future Shock event.

Bonzai Records:

In 1994, Vanderheyden signed a deal with Bonzai Records where he recorded a string of hits. His most famous releases from that period are Boots On The Run as INSIDER and Noxius under the Tyrome moniker. To date, most of these songs are played on a regular basis by new and rising DJ's all over the world.

During that same period, Vanderheyden wrote Sugar Is Sweeter and The Prophet, which ranked 11 and 19 on the UK Singles Chart respectively. 
The Armand Van Helden remix of Sugar Is Sweeter made it to #1 on the Billboard Hot Dance Club Songs Chart. The Prophet was a big underground hit as well.

Late 1990s:

Vanderheyden signed a non-exclusive deal with NEWS Records where he released INSIDER's The Swarm, another big club hit.

2000s to present:

Vanderheyden continued to perform around the world and in 2003, he moved to Minneapolis to join long time hero Dr. Fink from Prince and The Revolution. Together, they collaborated on an album at the esteemed Paisley Park recording facility with Prince alumnus and saxophonist Eric Leeds.

The last few years have seen Vanderheyden divide his time between Belgium, France and the United States, teaming up with a number of established music producers and mixers like producer Greg Cohen (John Legend, Lil Yachty, Nile Rodgers, Robin Thicke) on mixing, production and writing work for various major-label artists. Most recently, Vanderheyden again scored a couple of #1 positions on the Billboard Hot Dance Club Song Chart with his remix production work on Janet Jackson Made For Now and New Wave legends Blondie’s Fun.

Throughout the last two decades and presently, Vanderheyden continues to headline major summer and fall festivals most notably, Tomorrowland as INSIDER and Tyrome, among other related projects.

His latest track Dark Purple was picked up by DJs Sam Paganini and Charlotte de Witte who played it throughout the summer of 2019 on all major festivals such as Awakenings, Drumcode and Kappa Future Festival.

Discography

References

External links 
 Kris Vanderheyden at Discogs

Belgian record producers
Belgian producers
Belgian electronic musicians
1971 births
Belgian music people
Deep house musicians
Living people